John Fulton Reid (3 March 1956 – 28 December 2020) was a New Zealand cricketer. He was born in Auckland.

Cricket career
Reid completed his education at Lynfield College, well known for its cricket. Reid house at Lynfield College is named after him. He worked as a high school geography teacher while playing cricket.

Reid played in 19 Test matches and 25 One Day Internationals between 1979 and 1986. His Test average was 46.28 and included six Test centuries. His ODI average was 27.52. Despite having a very respectable batting average of 46.28, it was revealed by Cricinfo that Reid had the biggest difference in batting averages between first and second innings. He had a first innings average of 68.41, but a second innings average of only 12.09, a difference of more than 56 runs.

Ian Smith said that Reid's greatest innings for New Zealand was when he played against Sri Lanka in 1984 in Colombo. Reid batted for 11 hours for 180 runs off 445 balls in very hot conditions. This led New Zealand to win the match.

John Reid played an important part in New Zealand's first test win over Australia in Australia in 1985. He scored 108 runs and combined with Martin Crowe for a third wicket stand of 284. Richard Hadlee said of Reid "His contribution was quite significant ... those two put the game firmly in our control and gave us a significant lead that allowed us to win that first ever test in Australia".

John Reid 's cousin is former Australian cricketer Bruce Reid.

John Wright described him as “a person he was a good team man. He was a quiet achiever. He was always constant. Dependable. Reliable. Astute”

Ian Smith described him as "my ideal No 3 and in his all too few appearances at test level he showed why...a great judge of line, which made many accomplished overseas attacks adjust their plans. He had great stick-ability".

Cricket administration career 
John Reid was the chief executive of Auckland Cricket. He then appointed as the New Zealand caretaker coach for the centenary season of 1994–95. Moving south to Canterbury, he was appointed in 1996 as New Zealand Cricket's cricket operations manager and high-performance manager. He led the establishment of New Zealand Cricket's National High Performance Centre at Lincoln. This included developing the Bert Sutcliffe Oval, supporting grounds and the indoor training facility.

John Reid took on a new position with Sport NZ in 2005 and was a trustee of the Selwyn Sports Trust. In 2015 John Reid began a new role as the Selwyn District Council's major projects property manager. The wooden floor sports hall at the Selwyn Sports Centre in Rolleston has been named after John Reid in appreciation for his work as a champion of the courts and community sport in Selwyn.

Records
 He holds the New Zealand record of scoring 1,000 test runs in the fewest innings.

Death
John Reid died of cancer in Christchurch on 28 December 2020.

References

External links

Cricinfo article on batting averages of first and second innings

1956 births
2020 deaths
New Zealand cricketers
New Zealand Test cricketers
New Zealand One Day International cricketers
Auckland cricketers
Cricketers from Auckland
Deaths from cancer in New Zealand
North Island cricketers
People educated at Lynfield College